Richard Hewlett was an American-born officer of De Lancey's Brigade, a provincial Royalist unit based out of New York. He is most notable for leading the British side in the Battle of Setauket. He married Mary Townsend on December 6th, 1753 at St. George's Church. Together, they had 11 children.

Popular culture 
A heavily fictionalized version of Hewlett was portrayed by Burn Gorman in the AMC historical drama Turn: Washington's Spies.

References 

British America army officers
Loyalist military personnel of the American Revolutionary War
Loyalists in the American Revolution from New York (state)
People from Merrick, New York
1729 births
1789 deaths